Nerea Nevado Gómez (born 27 April 2001) is a Spanish professional footballer who plays for Liga F club Athletic Bilbao, mainly as a left back.

Nevado began her career as a child with hometown club Santurtzi and with Bizkerre (Getxo), joining Athletic Bilbao in 2016, aged 15. She made over 100 appearances for the B-team over five seasons, as well as featuring intermittently for the senior team from 2018. She moved on loan to Alavés, newly promoted to the top tier, in 2021.

At international level, Nevado was a member of the Spain under-17 squad that won the 2018 FIFA U-17 Women's World Cup in Uruguay.

References

External links
 
 Nerea Nevado at BDFutbol
 
 
 
 

2001 births
Living people
Spanish women's footballers
Footballers from the Basque Country (autonomous community)
Women's association football defenders
Women's association football midfielders
Segunda Federación (women) players
Primera División (women) players
Deportivo Alavés Gloriosas players
Athletic Club Femenino players
People from Santurtzi
Sportspeople from Biscay
Athletic Club Femenino B players
Spain women's youth international footballers